The Main road 813 is a short bypass direction Secondary class main road near Győr, that connects the M1 motorway's Győrszentiván junction to the Main road 14.

The road, as well as all other main roads in Hungary, is managed and maintained by Magyar Közút, state owned company.

See also

 Roads in Hungary

Sources

External links
 Hungarian Public Road Non-Profit Ltd. (Magyar Közút Nonprofit Zrt.)
 National Infrastructure Developer Ltd.

Main roads in Hungary
Győr-Moson-Sopron County